The 2009–10 Saint Mary's Gaels men's basketball team represented Saint Mary's College of California in the 2009–10 college basketball season, coached by Randy Bennett for the 9th consecutive year. The Gaels compete in the West Coast Conference and played their home games at the McKeon Pavilion. They finished conference play with a record of 11–3 to place second. They were the champions of the 2010 West Coast Conference men's basketball tournament and received the conference's automatic bid to the 2010 NCAA Division I men's basketball tournament where they entered as a No 10 seed South Region. Their first round win over 7 seed Richmond was the school's first tournament win since beating Idaho State in 1959. They continued to beat No 2 seed Villanova and advanced to the Sweet Sixteen where they lost to No 3 seed and AP #19 Baylor to end their season 28–6

Roster

Source

Schedule and results
Source
All times are Pacific

|-
!colspan=9| Regular season

|-
!colspan=9| West Coast Conference tournament

|-
!colspan=10| 2010 NCAA Division I men's basketball tournament

References

Saint Mary's
Saint Mary's Gaels men's basketball seasons
Saint Mary's
Saint Mary's Gaels men's basketball
Saint Mary's Gaels men's basketball